Herbert Christ (20 January 1941) was a German politician of the Free Democratic Party (FDP) and former member of the German Bundestag.

Life 
He was a member of the German Bundestag for one legislative period from 13 December 1972. He was elected via the state list of the FDP in Bavaria. In the Bundestag he was a full member of the committee for youth, family and health until September 1974. From September 1974 he became a member of the Committee for Economics.

Literature

References

1941 births
Members of the Bundestag for Bavaria
Members of the Bundestag 1972–1976
Members of the Bundestag for the Free Democratic Party (Germany)
Living people